One Piece Odyssey is a 2023 role-playing video game developed by ILCA and published by Bandai Namco Entertainment. A part of the One Piece franchise, it was released for PlayStation 4, PlayStation 5, Windows, and Xbox Series X/S on January 13.

Gameplay 
One Piece Odyssey is a turn-based role-playing game in which players control Monkey D. Luffy and the Straw Hat Pirates. Every playable character has a unique ability in line with their powers, which are used for traversal, collecting items, and solving puzzles. After engaging an enemy in the field, the game transitions to the battle screen, where the characters' actions are controlled using menu commands. The combat system revolves around "Scramble Area Battles" system, where battles are divided into several areas. 

Players can optimize the positions of party members between areas to counter opponents. In some battles a random element of the system titled "Dramatic Scene" places the player in inconvenient situations playing to the characters' personalities, such as Sanji being unable to attack because he is surrounded by women, and overcoming them nets greater rewards. As with other games in the genre, the party members earn experience points after battle and level up once enough points are accumulated.

Development 

One Piece Odyssey was announced on March 28, 2022, as part of the One Piece franchise's 25th anniversary. It was developed by ILCA and published by Bandai Namco Entertainment and released for PlayStation 4, PlayStation 5, Windows, and Xbox Series X/S on January 13, 2023. The game's soundtrack was composed by Motoi Sakuraba.

Reception 

One Piece Odyssey received "generally favorable" reviews for the Windows and Xbox Series X/S versions but received "mixed or average" reviews for the PlayStation 5 version, according to review aggregator Metacritic. The PlayStation 5 version continues to be plagued with issues downloading DLC.

The PlayStation 4 version of One Piece Odyssey was the second bestselling retail game throughout its first week of release in Japan, with 35,123 physical copies being sold. The PlayStation 5 version was the third bestselling retail game in the country throughout the same week, selling 26,879 physical copies.

References

External links 

2023 video games
Bandai Namco games
One Piece games
PlayStation 4 games
PlayStation 5 games
Role-playing video games
Single-player video games
Open-world video games
Video games developed in Japan
Video games scored by Motoi Sakuraba
Video games set on fictional islands
Windows games
Xbox Series X and Series S games